A joint honours degree (also known as dual honours, double majors, or Two Subject Moderatorship) is a specific type of degree offered generally at the Honours Bachelor's degree level by certain universities in Ireland, the UK, Canada, Malta, and Australia.  In a joint honours degree, two (or more) subjects are studied concurrently within the timeframe of one honours.

Requirements
A joint honours degree typically requires at least half, often almost all, of the credits required for each of its respective subjects. The two subjects do not have to be highly related; indeed, a true joint honours degree overlaps faculties, not just subjects. However, students often pick two subjects that are interrelated in some fundamental way (such as both subjects are in the arts).

Usually, joint honours degrees have higher requirements for entry than a single honours degree, requiring the approval of both departments concerned. The two subjects are then taken at the same levels and at the academic standards as those taking either subject as a single honours major. It is usual for these degrees to entail more study than a single honours degree (for example, both majors must be passed to earn the "joint degree" and honours must be obtained in the case of each major to earn the honours degree title); whereas this would normally apply to the only one subject major for a single honours student. In some cases, students would have significantly more final year project work and could be examined on this by both departments in question. Many British universities now have a dedicated Centre for Joint Honours Degrees which assists students with timetable structuring, etc.

Differences
A joint honours degree is different from BA (Hons.) degree where two subjects are listed in the degree title. In a single honours degree, one of these is a major and the other a minor; In a BA/BSc/BEng (Joint Hons.) both subjects are majors. A joint honours degree is also different from a double degree scheme: a double degree entails two separate degrees (e.g., a Bachelor of Science and a Bachelor of Arts) each of which with their own electives, etc.

Examples
Selected examples of joint honours degrees:
 Architecture and Planning
 Architecture and Structural Engineering
 Biology and Chemistry
 Botany and Zoology
 Business and Management
 Business and Economics
 Computing and Business
 Computing and Mathematics
 Drama and History of Art
 Economics and Accountancy
 Economics and History
 Economics and Management
 Economics and Politics
 Electronics and Computer Science
 Forensics and Anthropology
 History and International Relations
 History and Literature
 History and Politics
 Journalism and Literature
 Mathematics and Computer Science
 A Modern Foreign Language and Linguistics
 A Modern Foreign Language and History
 A Modern Foreign Language and a Classical Language (for example French and Latin)
 Modern Languages and History
 Music and Education
 Palaeobiology and Geology 
 Palaeontology and Evolution
 Physics and Mathematics
 Physics and Philosophy
 Physiology and Pharmacology
 Politics and International Relations
 Public Administration and Political Science

References